The 2002–03 season was the Persepolis's 2nd season in the Pro League, and their 20th consecutive season in the top division of Iranian Football. They were also be competing in the Hazfi Cup & AFC Champions League. Persepolis was captained by Afshin Peyrovani.

Squad
As of October 2002.

Transfers

In

Out

Technical staff

|}

Competition record

Iran Pro League

Standings

Competitions

Iran Pro League

Hazfi Cup

Machine Sazi 0–2 Persepolis on aggregate.

Malavan 2–2 Persepolis on aggregate. Malavan won the game on penalties (3–0)

AFC Champions League

Scorers

See also
 2002–03 Iran Pro League
 2002–03 Hazfi Cup
 2002–03 AFC Champions League

References

External links
Iran Premier League Statistics
RSSSF

Persepolis F.C. seasons
Persepolis